Vallavanukkum Vallavan is an 2023 Indian Tamil-language action comedy film written and directed by Vijay Tesingu, starring Bobby Simha, Sshivada and Pooja Devariya. It has music composed by Raghu Dixit, editing by Vivek Harshan, cinematography by Padmesh and it is produced by K. E. Gnanavel Raja. The film which began production in 2015 and was slated to release in 2016, had a delayed release on 20 January 2023.

Cast 

 Bobby Simha
 Sshivada as Azhagi
 Pooja Devariya
 Napoleon as Minister
 Karunakaran
 Anandaraj
 Appukutty
 Anthony Daasan

Production 
In September 2015, Bobby Simha said that he would produce and act in a venture called Vallavanuku Vallavan and that he had first heard and been impressed with the script in 2013. The film was to mark his first production venture,and purchase the project from Alphabet Production, from which he set up the studio, Assault Production. Sshivada and Pooja Devariya were cast as the film's lead actresses during October 2015, while Raghu Dixit, Vivek Harshan and Padmesh were signed on as music composer, editor and cinematographer respectively.

Soundtrack 
The soundtrack was composed by Raghu Dixit.

Release and reception 
Despite being completed in 2016, Vallanukkum Vallavan was released only in 20 January 2023, seven years after the delay.

India Today gave a negative review citing "Unfortunately for them, this movie has nothing going for it. It’s an age-old story which looks very 80s and Bobby Simha’s character is not a novelty factor. Though the director has tried to add some elements of comedy along with the con angle, it doesn’t work" and concluded the film "can be given a complete miss". The Times of India wrote "Vallavanukkum Vallavan would have definitely worked for the audience if it would have released few years ago as planned. But now, having witnessed a lot of films of this genre, it might hardly engage the viewers."

References

External links 
 

2020s Tamil-language films
2023 action comedy films
Indian action comedy films